Mabuya is a genus of long-tailed skinks restricted to species from various Caribbean islands. They are primarily carnivorous, though many are omnivorous. The genus is viviparous, having a highly evolved placenta that resembles that of eutherian mammals. Formerly, many Old World species were placed here, as Mabuya was a kind of "wastebasket taxon". These Old World species are now placed in the genera Chioninia, Eutropis, and Trachylepis. Under the older classification, the New World species were referred to as "American mabuyas", and now include the genera Alinea,  Aspronema, Brasiliscincus, Capitellum, Maracaiba, Marisora, Varzea, and Copeoglossum.

Most species in this genus are feared to be possibly extinct due to introduced predators.

Species
Listed alphabetically by specific name.

 
Mabuya cochonae  – Cochon's skink  (possibly extinct)
Mabuya desiradae  – Désirade skink 
Mabuya dominicana  – Dominica skink
Mabuya grandisterrae  – Grande-Terre skink (possibly extinct)
Mabuya guadeloupae  – Guadeloupe skink (possibly extinct)
Mabuya hispaniolae  – Hispaniolan two-lined skink (possibly extinct)
Mabuya mabouya  – Greater Martinique skink (possibly extinct)
Mabuya montserratae  – Montserrat skink (possibly extinct)
Mabuya parviterrae  – Petite Terre skink

Nota bene: A binomial authority in parentheses indicates that the species was originally described in a genus other than Mabuya.

References

Further reading
Fitzinger LI (1826). Neue Classification der Reptilien nach ihren natürlichen Verwandtschaften. Nebst einer Verwandtschafts-tafel und einem Verzeichnisse der Reptilien-Sammlung des K.K. Zoologischen Museums zu Wien. Vienna: J.G. Heubner. 5 unnumbered + 67 pp. + one plate. (Mabuya, new genus, p. 23). (in German and Latin).

External links

Mabuya by Cyberlizard at web.archive.org.

 
Skinks
Taxa named by Leopold Fitzinger
Lizard genera